Nali may refer to:

 Nalî (1797–1869), Kurdish poet
 Náli, a Dwarf of J. R. R. Tolkien's Middle-earth legendarium
 Nali, a dwarf of Norse mythology
 Nali, an alien race in the video game Unreal
 Mirza Nali (1784–1860), Mughal crown prince
 Nali Sauce, Malawian hot sauce made from Bird Eye Chilli
 Nali, Iran, village in Sistan and Baluchestan Province, Iran
 Nali (town) (那丽镇), in Qinnan District, Qinzhou, Guangxi, China
 Nali, nickname of the Austrian composer HK Gruber
 Nali, first solo studio album of the Italian singer-songwriter Annalisa
 Nali, a subunit of the Bigha, used for land measurement

See also
 Li Na (disambiguation), several people also known as Na Li